Nine Lime Avenue is a studio album by Australian recording artists, Kate Ceberano. The album consisting entirely of cover versions. The album was a commercial success and was certified gold in Australia.

Background
Commencing in February 2007, Ceberano competed in series 6 of Dancing with the Stars Australia, (which Ceberano would go on to win). The album was recorded whilst she was competing in this series, in just three weeks.

The record is a homage to her favourite songs of the 80's. Every song has been reinvented to mould the Kate Ceberano style. 
Ceberano said of the album, "I grew up on Lime Avenue and spent all my teenage years through the 80's listening to different music and firing up my lust for a career in music. I'm so nostalgic about that period of my life and in many ways wished we still had that house… this album I guess is a collection of different songs connected to different memories from that time"

Track listing
The album was released on April 21, 2007

Singles
 "Go Your Own Way" was released as the first (and only) single from 'Nine Lime Avenue'. It was released on 5 May 2007. A video was released on 29 April 2007

Charts

Weekly chart
The album was a commercial success. After debuting at #14, it later peaked at #4 on 20 May 2007.

End of year charts

Certification

Personnel
Credits 
Arranged By – Kate Ceberano, Philip Ceberano, Richard Pleasance, Sam Keevers, Steve Hadley, Thom Mann 
Backing Vocals – Philip Ceberano, Richard Pleasance, Steve Hadley, Thom Mann (tracks: 1, 10)
Bass – Richard Pleasance (tracks: 4), Steve Hadley (tracks: 1 to 3, 5 to 11)
Guitar – Philip Ceberano (tracks: 1 to 3, 5 to 11), Richard Pleasance
Keyboards – Richard Pleasance (tracks: 4), Sam Keevers (tracks: 1 to 3, 5 to 11)
Mandolin – Richard Pleasance
Mastered By, Mixed By – Steve Scanlon
Percussion – Javier Fredes (tracks: 8)
Piano – Sam Keevers
Producer – Richard Pleasance
Recorded By – Richard Pleasance
Violin – Nigel MacLean (tracks: 4)

Tour

Following the success of the album, Ceberano announced a national tour. Ceberano performed 'Brass In Pocket', 'Raspberry Beret' and 'Roxanne' as well as her greatest hits, 'Bedroom Eyes', 'Brave' and 'Pash' and her Jesus Christ Superstar spotlight song 'I Don't Know How To Love Him'.

'''Nine Lime Avenue Tour Dates

References

2007 albums
Kate Ceberano albums
Covers albums